Jammu and Kashmir Panchayati Raj Act, 1989 provides for Panchayati Raj in Jammu and Kashmir as an instrument of a local self government.

District Development Councils 
On 16 dec 2020, the Ministry of Home Affairs amended the 1989 Act and 1996 Rules to allow for the creation of a new form of governance in Jammu and Kashmir, District Development Councils, to which members would be elected.

References 

Jammu and Kashmir (state)
Indian legislation
State legislation in India